Yamada-ike  is a gravity dam located in Hyogo Prefecture in Japan. The dam is used for irrigation. The catchment area of the dam is 1.1 km2. The dam impounds about 4  ha of land when full and can store 424 thousand cubic meters of water.

See also
List of dams in Japan

References

Dams in Hyogo Prefecture